Jordan Thompson was the defending champion but lost in the quarterfinals to Quentin Halys.

Janko Tipsarević won the title after defeating Quentin Halys 6–7(5–7), 6–3, 6–4 in the final.

Seeds

Draw

Finals

Top half

Bottom half

References
Main Draw
Qualifying Draw

Kunming Open - Men's Singles
2017 in Chinese tennis
Kunming Open